Truck Stop is a 1983 supplement for Car Wars published by Steve Jackson Games.

Gameplay
Truck Stop is a supplement that includes rules for using 18-wheel semi-trailer trucks in Car Wars.

Reception
Craig Sheeley reviewed Truck Stop in The Space Gamer No. 63. Sheeley commented that "Car Wars players have been waiting for this ever since the game came out, and their wait is justified. If you liked the movie Road Warrior, if you like the idea of an unstoppable convoy, if you just like the idea of armed rigs, get this. But you must have Car Wars to use it."

GeekDad wrote that Truck Stop "would add a bit more flavor to the original game by providing tractor-trailer combos. Going up against my friends car-to-car was quite fun, but there’s something truly unique and memorable when three of my gaming buddies are taking on another pal who is driving an 18-wheeler with three machine gun turrets on top, more armor (points) on a single side of the trailer than all three of our cars combined, and enough speed to plow through any of us who get in front of him."

References

Car Wars